is a Japanese developer and publisher of video games located in Chiyoda, Tokyo. Originally established in 1985 as a computer software company, it expanded into producing for a number of game console and handheld systems. Its President and CEO in 2007 was Yoichi Miyaji at which time it was a member of the Computer Entertainment Supplier's Association of Japan (CESA).  Its major trading partners then included Square Enix, Bandai Namco, Koei Tecmo, and Gung-Ho Online Entertainment, some of whom co-developed or produced games in cooperation with the company.

The company has produced a number of games for several genres, beginning with the action game Thexder for personal computers in 1985.  A number of traditional and Mahjong-related games have also been produced for Japanese audiences.  In the Western world, Game Arts is best known as the producers of the Lunar and Grandia series of role-playing video games, as well as the Gungriffon line of vehicle simulation games. Some of its staff has helped in the preliminary development of Nintendo's Wii title Super Smash Bros. Brawl.

On April 22, 2009, Game Arts released the PlayStation port of Grandia in Japan on the PlayStation Network as a downloadable title in the PSone Classics range, to celebrate an upcoming announcement for Grandia Online.

Release history

References

External links
 

Amusement companies of Japan
GungHo Online Entertainment
Video game companies established in 1985
Video game companies of Japan
Video game development companies
Video game publishers
Japanese companies established in 1985
Software companies based in Tokyo